ST12 is an Indonesian band formed in Bandung, West Java in 20 January 2004. The group was formed by Ilham Febry a.k.a. Pepep (drummer), Dedy Sudrajat alias Pepeng (guitarist), Charly van Houten a.k.a. Charly (vocalist), and Iman Rush (guitarist). ST12 name stands for Jl. Stasiun Timur No. 12, which was the band's headquarters. As of 2010, ST12 had produced 5 albums.

History
ST12 was officially formed on January 20, 2004, although its members had long been in the music world. Earlier, they were not known to each other. They often met in the rental studio on Jl. Stasiun Timur No. 12, near Bandung railway station. The band was named by Pepep's father, Helmi Aziz. Charly liked jazz, Pepep liked jazz and rock, while Pepeng grew up with rock music. After failing to get a recording contract, ST12 went indie (independent). Their debut album Jalan Terbaik was released in 2006. Unfortunately, during the promotional tour in Semarang, Iman Rush died after a brain hemorrhage in October 2005.

The success of their debut album ST12 caught the attention of Trinity Optima Production. ST12 also released a second album P.U.S.P.A(2008) in tribute to Iman Rush.

In 2012, Indonesian division of Universal Music Group has reformed ST12 by joining the two new members, Rido Tuah and Koko, as Charly and Pepeng's replacement. In 2014, Dimas Moersas has joined the group as Rido Tuah and Koko's replacement.

Discography

As distributed by Trinity Optima Production
 Jalan Terbaik (2005)
 P.U.S.P.A (2008)
 P.U.S.P.A Repackage (2009)
 Pangeran Cinta (2010)

As distributed by Universal Music Indonesia
 Lentera Hati (2013)
 Terjemahan Hati (2014)

References

External links 
 The Official Website of ST12
 Blog STSETIA
 Ulasan ST12
 Berita ST12
 ST12 profile on kapanlagi.com

Indonesian melayu music groups
Indonesian pop music groups
Musical groups established in 2004